Mislav Karoglan (born 14 April 1982) is a Bosnian-Croatian professional football manager and former player. He was most recently the manager of Croatian Football League club Hajduk Split.

Karoglan is of Croat ethnicity.

Playing career
Karoglan has played for MŠK Žilina in Slovakian Corgoň Liga. Previously, he played for Široki Brijeg and Zrinjski Mostar in Premier League of Bosnia and Herzegovina. He also played for Kamen Ingrad in the Croatian Prva HNL. On 20 August 2009 he signed a two-year deal with Croatian side Rijeka.

Coaching career
Karoglan managed Croatia Zmijavci in 2016, leading them to a 9th placed finish out of 16. In 2022, he was appointed head coach of HNK Hajduk Split.

References

1982 births
Living people
Sportspeople from Imotski
Croats of Bosnia and Herzegovina
Association football midfielders
Bosnia and Herzegovina footballers
Bosnia and Herzegovina under-21 international footballers
HŠK Posušje players
NK Kamen Ingrad players
HŠK Zrinjski Mostar players
Hapoel Nof HaGalil F.C. players
NK Široki Brijeg players
MŠK Žilina players
HNK Rijeka players
NK Imotski players
Warriors FC players
Premier League of Bosnia and Herzegovina players
Croatian Football League players
Israeli Premier League players
Slovak Super Liga players
Singapore Premier League players
Second Football League (Croatia) players
Bosnia and Herzegovina expatriate footballers
Expatriate footballers in Croatia
Bosnia and Herzegovina expatriate sportspeople in Croatia
Expatriate footballers in Israel
Bosnia and Herzegovina expatriate sportspeople in Israel
Expatriate footballers in Slovakia
Bosnia and Herzegovina expatriate sportspeople in Slovakia
Expatriate footballers in Singapore
Bosnia and Herzegovina expatriate sportspeople in Singapore
Bosnia and Herzegovina football managers
NK Zadar managers
Bosnia and Herzegovina expatriate football managers
Expatriate football managers in Croatia